Dewan Sufi Dilpat(ديوان صوفي دلپت), was a Sindhi Hindu poet born in Sindh Sewan in 1777, where he was educated.
He later moved to Hyderabad to work in the Talpur government. There he became a devotee of Hindu Dewan Asoram; he left his job and opened his own school known in the Sindhi language as (thekano).
He also went to the shrine of Sufi Shah Inayat Shaheed.
He died on 1841.

References

1777 births
1841 deaths